Peptidase M20 domain containing 1 is a circulating enzyme which in humans is encoded by the PM20D1 gene. PM20D1 regulates bioactive N-acyl amide lipids and has been implicated in obesity, type 2 diabetes, pain, and Alzheimer's disease.

Function 
PM20D1 catalyzes the biosynthesis of N-fatty acyl amino acids from free fatty acids and free amino acids. Consequently PM20D1 is involved in the generation of potent bioactive lipid metabolites from two abundant cellular energy precursors.

PM20D1 is involved in energy homeostasis. In mice, PM20D1 is highly expressed and secreted into the blood by brown fat. Its expression in adipose tissues is increased following cold exposure. Genetic elevation of circulating PM20D1 in mice leads to accumulation of multiple circulating N-acyl amino acid species and a hypermetabolic phenotype. Conversely, PM20D1-KO exhibit bidirectional dysregulation of circulating N-acyl amino acids, insulin resistance, and glucose intolerance. Mechanistically, N-fatty acyl amino acids function as UCP1-independent uncouplers of mitochondrial respiration.

PM20D1 has also been implicated in neurological diseases. PM20D1 expression is increased both in vitro and in vivo following neurotoxic insults. Forced overexpression of PM20D1 in the hippocampus results in improved learning performance in a mouse model of Alzheimer's disease whereas PM20D1 knockdown increases amyloid plaque load.

Clinical significance 

In human visceral and subcutaneous adipocytes, PM20D1 is one of the most highly up-regulated genes by the anti-diabetic thiazolidinedione drug rosiglitazone, suggesting a potential role for this enzyme and/or N-fatty acyl amino acids in obesity and diabetes. 

Methylation at or near the PM20D1 locus has been correlated to body mass index.  

In humans, the PM20D1 locus has been associated with Alzheimer's disease.

References